Butchart Butte is a -elevation summit located in the Grand Canyon, in Coconino County of northern Arizona, United States. It is situated on the North Rim, midway between Gunther Castle and Siegfried Pyre, and between the Chuar and Kwagunt Valleys.

This butte is named in honor for Dr. John Harvey Butchart (1907–2002), a mathematics professor and explorer well known for his hiking and climbing accomplishments at the Grand Canyon. He climbed 83 summits and claimed 28 first ascents within the canyon, for which he holds the record. This feature's name was officially adopted in 2009 by the U.S. Board on Geographic Names. Fellow canyoneer Jim Haggart submitted the naming proposal for consideration, and whereas Butchart did climb nearest higher neighbor Siegfried Pyre, he did not climb this butte that now bears his name.

Butchart Butte is composed of a cupola of remnant Permian Coconino Sandstone overlaying strata of the Pennsylvanian-Permian Supai Group. This in turn overlays the cliff-forming layer of Mississippian Redwall Limestone, which in turn overlays Cambrian Tonto Group, and finally Neoproterozoic Chuar Group at river level. According to the Köppen climate classification system, Butchart Butte is located in a Cold semi-arid climate zone. Precipitation runoff from this feature drains  to the nearby Colorado River via Chuar Creek (southeast) and Kwagunt Creek (northeast).

Gallery

See also
 Geology of the Grand Canyon area

References

External links 
 Weather forecast: National Weather Service
 Butchart Butte photo by Harvey Butchart

Grand Canyon
Landforms of Coconino County, Arizona
Buttes of Arizona
Colorado Plateau
Grand Canyon National Park
North American 2000 m summits
Sandstone formations of the United States